Mary Lalle Foley-Berkeley, 17th Baroness Berkeley (9 October 1905 – 17 October 1992) was a British politician and peeress.

Life and wealth
She was born in Chertsey, Surrey, United Kingdom on 9 October 1905. Daughter of Lt-Col. Frank Wigram Foley and Eva Mary FitzHardinge Milman, 16th Baroness Berkeley.

Born as Mary Lalle Foley, she changed her name legally to Hon. Mary Lalle Foley-Berkeley in 1951.

She was an active member of the House of Lords and participated in several debates from 1970 to 1977.

She succeeded to the title of 17th Baroness Berkeley on 5 April 1967 when the abeyance of the barony was terminated in her favour. She died unmarried at the age of 87, on which her title passed to nephew Anthony Gueterbock.

References

1905 births
1992 deaths
17
Mary
Hereditary women peers
20th-century British politicians
20th-century British women politicians
English baronesses
Daughters of barons
20th-century British women
20th-century English nobility